This is a list of seminaries and theological colleges in Myanmar.

A
Advancing Christ Theological Seminary
Advanced Institute of Mission
All Nations Theological Seminary
Antioch Christian Bible College 
Apostolic Christian Bible College

B
 Believers Church Biblical Seminary (N/Dagon) (Formerly known as GFABC)
Beulah Theological Seminary 
Bethel Baptist Bible Institute
Bethany Theological Seminary
Biblical School of Theology

C
Chin Christian College
Chin Christian Institute of Theology
Canaan Theological College
Christian International School of Theology
Christian Theological College
Church Planting Training School
Cornerstone Bible College

D
Dagon Bible Institute
Dawn Mission Training Centre
Disciple Bible College
Doulous Theological Seminary

E
Eastern Bible Institute
Evangelical Baptist Bible School
Evangelical Bible College 
Evangelical Bible Seminary
Evangelical Christian Bible School, Yangon
Evangelical Reformed Seminary

F
Faith Baptist Bible College & Theological Seminary (Myanmar)
Faith Bible Training Centre
Far Eastern Fundamental School of Theology
Free Gospel Outreach Bible College

G
Gospel Baptist Bible Seminary
Grace Baptist Theological Seminary
Grace Bible Seminary
Grace Biblical School of Theology
Grace School of Mission 
Grace Theological College

H
Hakha Gospel Baptist Bible Seminary
Hermon Biblical School of Theology
Holy Cross Theological College
Holiness Theological Seminary
House of Praise Bible Institute

I
Immanuel Bible College, Pyin Oo Lwin
Institute of Mission & Church Planting

K
Kalay Christian College 
Kalay Gospel Baptist Bible College
Karen Baptist Theological Seminary

L
Life Theological College
Life Theological College 
Lisu Theological Seminary of Myanmar
Living Centre Theological Seminary
Lorrain Theological College

M
MaMe Bible Academy (Kalay)
McNeilus Maranatha Christian College - MMCC
Myanmar Christian Preachers Training College, Yangon (Rangoon)
Myanmar Institute of Theology
Myanmar Institute of Christian Theology
Methodist Institute of Theology
Minister's Training College
Missionary Bible Institute 
Missionary Training School
Mt. Zion Bible Institute Correspondent 
Myanmar Bible Seminary
Myanmar Biblical Christian Institute
Myanmar Centre for Theological Studies
Myanmar Evangelical Graduate School of Theology
Myanmar Evangelical Mission Bible College
Myanmar Evangelical Theological Seminary
Myanmar Global Centre Theological Seminary
Myanmar Reformed Presbyterian School of Theology
Myanmar School of Bible & Mission Canna Garden 
Myanmar School of Theology & Mission
Myanmar Theological College, Mandalay
Myanmar Theological College
Myanmar Union Adventist Seminary
Myanmar Vision Christian College
Myitkyina Christian Seminary

N
Northern Shan State Union Christian College

P
Paku Divinity School
 Pacific Rim Bible College
Pwo Karen Theological Seminary
Paniel Bible College
Puato Baptist Bible College (PBBC)

R
Reaching The World Bible College
Reformed Bible Institute 
Reformed Theological College
Reformed Theological Seminary
Restoration Bible Institute

S
School of Gospel Ministry 
South East Asia Bible College
South East Asia Mission College, Yangon
South -East Asia Nazarene Bible College

T
Tahan Institute of Theology
Tahan Theological College
Tedim Christian College
The Wholistic 
The Word College
Trinity College

U
Union Theological College
Union Bible Seminary

V
Victorious Bible Institute

Y
Yangon Adventist Seminary 
Yangon Bible Institute 
Yangon Bible Seminary
Yangon Graduate School of Theology
Yangon Gospel Baptist Bible College
Yangon Theological Seminary
Yangon Vision Christian College

Z

Seminaries and theological colleges
 
Universities and colleges in Myanmar
Seminaries and theological colleges in Burma